As of 2015, there was only one translation of the Tirukkural available in Finnish.

History of translations
The translation by Pentti Aalto made in 1972 is the only translation of the Tirukkural into Finnish. It was published in Helsinki  by the Societas Orientalis Fennica.

Translations

See also
 Tirukkural translations
 List of Tirukkural translations by language

References

External links
 

Finnish
Finnish-language literature
Translations into Finnish